Jalal-Abad State University named after B.Osmonov Medical Faculty- JaSU (Russian: Б.Осмонов атындагы Жалал-Абад Мамлекеттик Университет Медицина факультети – ЖаГУ) (Kyrgyz: Жалал-Абад мамлекеттик Университет) was founded on April 2, 1993 in the city of Jalal-Abad, Kyrgyzstan on the basis of already functioning educational institutions.

This is a public institution designed to provide higher education in following fields: Medical, Electronics, Energy, Construction,  Agro-industrial complex.

About JASU 
Approximately 10,000 students study at JASU, and there are more than 700 teachers, including 100 doctors of science and professors, as well as 216 candidates of science and docents. Approximately 3000 students from countries such as India, Iran, Israel, Kazakhstan, Nepal, Pakistan, Palestine, Syria, Turkey, Turkmenistan, the United States, and Uzbekistan also study at the university. The university produces specialists with high quality education in 54 fields and a secondary professional education in 12 fields. The medical faculty of Jalal-Abad State University named after B.Osmonov is affiliated with the Ministry of Health and Science Education. Jalal-Abad State University named after B.Osmonov Medical Faculty was opened by the president of Kyrgyz Republic on April 2, 1993 as a state educational institution designed to provide training for specialists with basic and complete higher education in such areas as electronics, energy, construction, medicine, education, and also specialists for the agro-industrial complex.

History 
 Jalalabad State University named after B.Osmonov Medical Faculty (JaSU) was founded on April 2, 1993 on the basis of already functioning educational institutions.
 The pedagogical faculty was founded in 1926 and zoo veterinary technical school was formed in 1947 in Jalal-Abad.
 Branches of Frunze Polytechnic Institute were founded in 1963 in Kara-kul and in 1990 in Tash-Komur.
 An engineering technical faculty was founded in 1981 in Kochkor-Ata.
 An electro-mechanical technical faculty was founded in 1965 in Mayluu-Suu.

Faculties 
 Faculty of Medicine
 Faculty of Nursing
 Business and Pedagogical Faculty
 Kara-Kul Technical Faculty
 Tash-Komur Technological Faculty
 Zoological & Veterinary Technical Faculty
 Kochkor-Ata Electronic Technical College
 Mayluu-Suu Electro-Mechanical College
 Chemical Engineering
 Industrial Water Engineering
 Construction and Civil Engineering and instrumentation
 Electricity and Power Engineering
 Physical Training and Sport
 Preparatory Studies
 Physics and Mathematics
 Computer Sciences

Library 
The library of Jalal-Abad State University named after B.Osmonov is home to many thousand of books. Every Faculty of Jalal-Abad State University named after B.Osmonov has its own library. The library of the Medical Faculty is online as well as in person. The library has collection of books from many different fields, with many of the books written by international authors. The library is also home to video lectures by professors of the university as well as other famous medical video tutors. The student of Jalal-Abad State University named after B.Osmonov Medical Faculty can access these video lectures anywhere with the help of Internet, a student user id and password. The library of university is under CCTV surveillance 24 hours a day, to promote safety and security.

Hospitals 
The teaching hospitals are well-equipped with modern diagnostic and treatment facilities to train students at higher scientific and professional levels. The university is affiliated to the following hospitals where medical students can go and practice in their free time with the supervision of a qualified medical professional.

Hospital affiliations
 Jalal-Abad City Hospital
 Jalal-Abad perinatal Hospital
 Jalal-Abad territorial Polyclinic
 Jalal-Abad City Maternity Hospital
 Osh provincial Clinical Hospital
 Osh City territorial Hospital
 City Hospital of Infectious diseases
 Osh Inter Provincial center of Oncology

Administration of JaSU

Notable alumni 
 Rakhat Achylova

References

External links 
 
 
 
 
 uniRank
 Jalalabat State University at World Higher Education Database

Education International
Universities in Kyrgyzstan